William Handcock (1676 – August 1723) was an Irish politician.

He was the eldest son of Thomas Handcock and his wife Dorothy Green. Handcock entered the Irish House of Commons in 1703, representing the constituency of  Athlone until 1714. He sat for Dublin City from 1721 until his death two years later.

He married Sarah Warburton, daughter of Richard Warburton and had by her six sons and four daughters. His oldest son William and his sixth son John Gustavus Handcock both were also members of the Parliament of Ireland.

References

1676 births
1723 deaths
Irish MPs 1703–1713
Irish MPs 1713–1714
Irish MPs 1715–1727
Members of the Parliament of Ireland (pre-1801) for Athlone
Members of the Parliament of Ireland (pre-1801) for County Westmeath constituencies